Eric L. Buckson is a Delaware politician.

He represented the 4th District Commissioner for Kent County Levy Court.  Buckson was elected in 2006.

A Republican, he is a member of the Delaware Senate, where he has represented the 16th District since 2022.

Early life
Buckson was born in Camden, Delaware and graduated from Caesar Rodney High School in 1983 and the University of Delaware in 1988.

Career in politics
Buckson is a member of Kent County Levy Court in Kent County, Delaware. In 2008, Buckson was considered a potential candidate for Lieutenant Governor of Delaware. Buckson first ran for the state senate in 2022, defeating long time incumbent Colin Bonini in the Republican primary.

Family life
Buckson is the son of the late Governor of Delaware, David P. Buckson (1920- 2017).  Buckson is married and has four children.

References

External links
 
 

Living people
Delaware Republicans
People from Camden, Delaware
University of Delaware alumni
Year of birth missing (living people)